Haughton is a town in Bossier Parish, Louisiana, United States. The population was 4,539 in 2020. It is part of the Shreveport–Bossier City metropolitan statistical area.

Geography
Interstate 20 touches the northwestern corner of the town, with access from Exit 33 (Elm Street).

Climate
The climate in this area is characterized by hot, humid summers and generally mild to cool winters.  According to the Köppen Climate Classification system, Haughton has a humid subtropical climate, abbreviated "Cfa" on climate maps.

Demographics

As of the 2020 United States census, there were 4,539 people, 1,139 households, and 891 families residing in the town.

Notable people 
 Dak Prescott, professional football player
Myron Baker, linebacker for the Chicago Bears from 1993 to 1995. 
Joe Delaney, NFL player for the Kansas City Chiefs who drowned while attempting to save three children
E. S. Dortch, planter and politician; last surviving (1943) Bossier Parish veteran of the Confederate States Army
John A. Franks, thoroughbred racehorse breeder who won an Eclipse Award for Outstanding Owner
Paul Rasmussen, head minister Highland Park United Methodist Church, Dallas, Texas

Gallery

References

Towns in Bossier Parish, Louisiana
Towns in Louisiana
Towns in Shreveport – Bossier City metropolitan area